Selenium monochloride is an inorganic compound with the formula Se2Cl2. Although it is called selenium monochloride, a more descriptive name might be diselenium dichloride. It is a reddish-brown, oily liquid that hydrolyses slowly.  It exists in chemical equilibrium with SeCl2, SeCl4, chlorine, and elemental selenium. Selenium monochloride is mainly used as a reagent for the synthesis of Se-containing compounds.

Structure and properties
Selenium monochloride has the connectivity Cl-Se-Se-Cl. With a nonplanar structure, it has C2 molecular symmetry, similar to hydrogen peroxide and sulfur monochloride.  The Se-Se bond length is 2.23 Å, and the Se-Cl bond lengths are 2.20 Å. The dihedral angle is 87°.

Preparation
Early routes to selenium monochloride involved chlorination of elemental selenium.  An improved method involves the reaction of a mixture of selenium, selenium dioxide, and hydrochloric acid:
3 Se + SeO2 + 4 HCl → 2 Se2Cl2 + 2 H2O

A dense layer of selenium monochloride settles from the reaction mixture, which can be purified by dissolving it in fuming sulfuric acid and reprecipitating it with hydrochloric acid.  A second method for the synthesis involves the reaction of selenium with oleum and hydrochloric acid:
2 Se + 2 SO3 + 3 HCl → Se2Cl2 + H2SO3 + SO2(OH)Cl
The crude selenium monochloride is removed via separatory funnel.  Selenium monochloride cannot be distilled without decomposition, even at reduced pressure.

In acetonitrile solutions, it exists in equilibrium with SeCl2 and SeCl4. Selenium dichloride degrades to the monochloride after a few minutes at room temperature:
3 SeCl2  →  Se2Cl2  +  SeCl4

Reactions
Selenium monochloride is an electrophilic selenizing agent, and thus it reacts with simple alkenes to give bis(β-chloroalkyl)selenide and bis(chloroalkyl)selenium dichloride.  It converts hydrazones of hindered ketones into the corresponding selenoketones, the structural analogs of ketones whereby the oxygen atom is replaced with a selenium atom.  Finally, the compound has been used to introduce bridging selenium ligands between the metal atoms of some iron and chromium carbonyl complexes.

References

Selenium compounds
Chlorides
Nonmetal halides
Chalcohalides